Hestiochora xanthocoma is a moth of the family Zygaenidae. It is found Australia from the tropical parts of the Northern Territory and Queensland.

The length of the forewings is 7–8 mm for males and 8–8.5 mm for females. The wingspan is about 20 mm. Adults are rather wasp like. They have a black body with some yellow bands, and a yellow collar around their heads. The wings are black with a broad yellow stripe along the middle of each wing. The underside of the abdomen is white.

It is a tropical species with possibly several generations per year.

External links
Australian Faunal Directory
Australian Insects
Zygaenid moths of Australia: a revision of the Australian Zygaenidae

Procridinae
Moths described in 1886